Ethan Cox (born July 25, 1987) is a Canadian professional ice hockey player. He is currently playing with the Reading Royals of the ECHL.

Cox played attended Colgate University and played four seasons of college hockey with the Colgate Raiders men's ice hockey where he scored 17 goals and 24 assists for 41 points, and earned 70 penalty minutes in 150 games played.

References

External links

1987 births
Living people
Alaska Aces (ECHL) players
Bridgeport Sound Tigers players
Powell River Kings players
Canadian ice hockey right wingers
Colgate Raiders men's ice hockey players
Peoria Rivermen (AHL) players
Portland Pirates players
Reading Royals players
People from Richmond, British Columbia
Ice hockey people from British Columbia